Taylorville is a small town on the banks of the Grey River, It is roughly 10 kilometers from the mouth of the river in Greymouth

The local Taylorville swimming hole is popular for swimming and dog-walking, but West Coast Regional Council advises against swimming in it after heavy rain due to elevated levels of E. coli.

Taylorville is also right next to the historic Brunner Mine site.

Taylorville used to be connected to Wallsend, located on the opposite side of the Grey River, with a suspension bridge for pedestrians providing a connection. The bridge washed away in the 1960s.

References

Grey District
Populated places in the West Coast, New Zealand